Haskovo is a city in the region of Northern Thrace in southern Bulgaria and the administrative centre of the Haskovo Province, not far from the borders with Greece and Turkey. According to Operative Program Regional Development of Bulgaria, the urban area of Haskovo is the seventh largest in Bulgaria and has a population of 184,731 inhabitants. The number of inhabitants of Town of Haskovo is 67,086 people, according to the 2021 census.

The first settlement found in Haskovo is from circa 5000 BC. Haskovo celebrated its 1,000th anniversary as a town in 1985. To mark the event, a new clock tower was erected in the centre of the town.

Haskovo Cove in Greenwich Island in the South Shetland Islands, Antarctica, is named after the city of Haskovo.

Geography

Climate
Winters are cold, albeit not as snowy as the western and northern parts of the country. Summers are hot and moderately dry, due to Mediterranean influence.

Etymology
The name of the town is derived from its earlier Ottoman-era name Hasköy, which is a hybrid Arabic-Turkish compound meaning "special village" (Turkish has "special" via Arabic خَاصّ‎ + Turkish köy "village"). It was so named after it became the centre of an Ottoman administrative district in the region. The ancient Thracian name of the settlement was Marsa, by which it was known until as late as 1782. By 1830, it was known by its Turkish name, Hasköy. The Bulgarian (and common Slavic) placename suffix "-ovo" replaced the Turkish "köy" after the city switched to Bulgarian from Ottoman rule.

History
According to archeologists, the area of Haskovo was originally settled about seven thousand years ago. In and around Haskovo, evidence has been preserved that confirms its long history during the prehistoric, Thracian, Greek, Roman, and Byzantine periods. In the 9th century – during the First Bulgarian Empire – a fortress was built in Haskovo that soon was transformed into a town. The town was located at the centre of a sizable region between the Klokotnitsa, Harmanliyska, and Maritsa rivers.

Ottoman era
The village and surrounding area became part of the Ottoman Empire shortly after the conquest of Edirne in 1361. During the time of Mehmed the Conqueror, Hasköy, as it was then known, was settled by around 750 people, consisting of 150 Muslim families spread across 12 neighbourhoods: Hacı Mahmud, Îsâ Fakih, Sofular, Saraç İnebey, Saraç Musa, Hacı Kayalı, Cüllâh, Hacı İsmâil, Kadı, Debbâğlar, Hacı Bayezid and Dervişan. The village acquired a largely agricultural character during most of the Ottoman period; there was also a thriving cottage industry and craftsmen such as saddlers, tanners, shoemakers, furriers and soapmakers, dyers, and chandlers made their home in Hasköy. In 1515 the population increased to 1400 people in 274 households, and in 1530 it was recorded that there was one Friday mosque (cami) as well as six smaller mosques in the village.

In 1592, the Ottoman Grand Vizier Koca Sinan Pasha commissioned the building of two caravanserais, two baths, shops, a mosque and an almshouse at the request of the people. According to the Austrian historian and orientalist Joseph von Hammer-Purgstall, Sinan Pasha also inaugurated the nearby Uzuncaova (Uzundzhovo) fair, which would become famous in all of Ottoman Bulgaria.

The town's importance increased in the 19th century. With its markets and fairs Hasköy became a significant centre of commerce in the Sanjak (District) of Filibe. At the same time, an increasing number of Bulgarians and other minorities came to settle in the town. By the second half of the  century the population had grown to about 6000 people, of whom 3500 were non-Muslims and only 2500 were Turks. In the 1870s Hasköy was a hotbed of revolutionary activity during the Bulgarian National Revival and subsequent Russo-Turkish War of 1877-1878, after which de facto Ottoman control of the town came to an end.

Modern era

Haskovo was part of Eastern Rumelia from 1878–1885, and was then incorporated into the autonomous Principality of Bulgaria, which declared full independence from the Ottoman Empire in 1908. It was renamed Haskovo after Bulgarian independence.

After the liberation from Ottoman rule in 1878, the Haskovo region became popular for high-quality tobacco production. However, presently there is no cigarette production in the region anymore after the once big Tobacco company "Haskovo-BT" closed in 2005. Currently, the biggest enterprises produce food, machinery, and textiles.

Population 
The population of Haskovo was 14,191 in 1887. Since then it started growing decade by decade, mostly because of the migrants from the rural areas and the surrounding smaller towns. It reached its peak in the period 1987–1991, when the population exceeded 90,000.

In December 2017, Haskovo's population was 71,214 people within the city limits. The Haskovo Municipality, with the legally affiliated adjacent villages, had a population of 87,780.

Ethnic and religious composition

According to the latest 2011 census data, the individuals declared their ethnic identity were distributed as follows:
Bulgarians: 54,869 (79.3%)
Turks: 12,507 (18.1%)
Roma: 691 (1.0%)
Others: 400 (0.8%)
Indefinable: 709 (0.7%)
 Undeclared: 7,221 (9.5%)
Total: 76,397

In Haskovo Municipality 63,963 declared as Bulgarians, 16,890 as Turks, 3859 as Roma and 8,984 did not declare their ethnic group. Most of the 28,444 Turks (12.5%) in Haskovo Province are concentrated within the city and the municipality, while the Bulgarians have a higher proportion in the province than the city, numbering 180,541 (79.4%).

According to the 2001 census, the Orthodox Christians are around 80% vs. around 20% Muslims.

Culture

The most notable cultural landmarks in Haskovo are the Ivan Dimov drama theater, renovated in 2004, the Museum of History, and an art gallery. The annual Colourful Thrace Sings and Dances folk festival takes place in the nearby park Kenana.

A 32-metre-high monument of the Mother of God and the Infant Jesus was erected on the Hill of Youth near Haskovo in 2003. The monument was inaugurated on 8 September on the occasion of the Nativity of Holy Virgin Mary, when the day of the town of Haskovo is celebrated. It was entered into the Guinness Book of Records as the highest monument to the Mother of God in the world.

Haskovo has recently invested in renovating its town center, with a variety of new sculptures and fountains erected.

Municipal landmarks include the Thracian Aleksandrovo tomb as well as Uzundzhovo's Church of the Assumption, built originally as a mosque during Ottoman times. In 1395 the Eski cami (the Old Mosque) was built as one of the first in the Balkans. Its minaret is slightly inclined.

Notable people
 Tane Nikolov (1873–1947), revolutionary
 Asen Zlatarov (1885–1936), scientist
 Anyu Angelov (1942), acting Minister of Defence
 Stanimir Stoilov (b. 1967), footballer and football manager
 Grigor Dimitrov (b. 1991), tennis player; 2008 Wimbledon and US Open junior champion
 Georgi Andreev (b. 1969), director of the National Folk Ensemble "Filip Kutev"
 Ciguli (1957–2014), Turkish-romani singer and musician
 Yuri Yunakov (b. 1958), Roma musician, known for participating in the development of Bulgarian wedding music and introducing it to the United States
Asparuh Leshnikov – Ari (b. 1897–1978), musician
Asen Vasilev (b. 1977) acting Minister of Finance
Gabriela Stoeva (b. 1994) badminton player, three-time European Champion and European Games gold medalist as well

Places to visit

Monuments 
 Monument to Captain Petko Voivoda
 Monument to the Unknown Warrior
 Monument to the Haskovo Revivalists
 Monument to the 10th Rhodope Infantry Regiment
 Monument of Envy
 Monument to the Haskovo Revivalists
 Monument to the Victory
 Monument to Dimitar Ivanov-Litso

Sacred architecture 
 The monument "Holy Mother of God" entered the Guinness World Records as the world's tallest statue of the Blessed Virgin Mary with the Infant. The monument was erected with respect, love and gratitude to the Mother of God. It was opened in 2003 with the consecration of water by Metropolitan Arseniy. In 2005 it was entered in the Guinness Book of World Records, and since 2009 it is in the list of the Hundred National Tourist Sites of Bulgaria.
 The bell tower - with impressive dimensions and unforgettable views rises above the town of Haskovo. The almost 29-meter-high bell tower was erected in 2010 next to the Holy Mother of God monument and quickly took its place in the resulting architectural ensemble.
 The Old Mosque (Eski Mosque) is the earliest mosque in the Bulgarian lands. It was built immediately after the invasion of the Ottoman Turks in Bulgaria, in the year 797 AH (1395 AD). In 1968 the Eski Mosque was declared a cultural monument. Currently, the mosque is significantly dug into the ground (probably due to the rising level of the surrounding streets).
 The Church of the Assumption of the Blessed Virgin in the village of Uzundzhovo, near Haskovo, is unique not only in its architecture, but also in the history it tells. Created as a Christian temple, it was destroyed by the Ottoman Empire and a mosque was built in its place. At the beginning of the 20th century, Turkey returned the property to Bulgaria and then began the reconstruction of the mosque into a church. In 2007 the church was restored mainly by the Municipality of Haskovo. During the restoration, two medieval inscriptions in Arabic with religious and philosophical themes were found, which have not yet been precisely dated. In the last century, the Church of the Assumption of the Blessed Virgin Mary in the village of Uzundzhovo was declared a cultural monument.

Twin towns – sister cities

Haskovo is twinned with:

 Edirne, Turkey
 Enguera, Spain
 Leicester, England, United Kingdom
 Shatura, Russia
  Veszprém, Hungary
 Viseu, Portugal

Economy

The branch structure of the economy of Haskovo municipality is diverse and consists of Bulgarian and international companies of different sizes. These companies sell their products in both foreign and domestic markets.

The future development of the municipality is related to the full use of natural and climatic conditions in the field of agriculture - efforts to develop promising market-oriented agricultural production, creation of agricultural consulting centers and others. The historical features and the rich culture of the region, in combination with the well-developed transport and tourist infrastructure, are a favorable factor for the development of tourism. The partnership relations established by the municipality with cities from England, Austria, France, Greece, Turkey, Italy, Spain, Portugal, the US, Russia, Serbia, Belarus also have a valuable contribution in this respect.

Gallery

References

External links

 Haskovo municipality website
 Online guide of Haskovo
 Haskovo.net
 Haskovo municipality at Domino.bg 
 Haskovo.info
 Haskovo.biz
 Haskovlii.com
 Haskovo News 
 Сайт за безплатни обяви
 Tourist Information Center - Haskovo

 
Populated places in Haskovo Province